Abbé Nicolas Thyrel de Boismont (12 June 1715 – 20 December 1786) was a French abbot and a pulpit orator.

1715 births
1786 deaths
French abbots
Members of the Académie Française